The 2008–09 Biathlon IBU Cup was a multi-race tournament over a season of biathlon, organised by the International Biathlon Union. The season started on 29 November 2008 in Idre, Sweden, and ended on 14 March 2009 in Ridnaun-Val Ridanna, Italy.

Calendar 
Below is the World Cup calendar for the 2008–09 season.

Standings (men)

Overall

Individual

Sprint

Pursuit

Relay

References

IBU Cup
2008 in biathlon
2009 in biathlon
2008 in European sport
2009 in European sport